Chimuan (also Chimúan) or Yuncan (Yunga–Puruhá, Yunca–Puruhán) is a hypothetical small extinct language family of northern Peru and Ecuador (inter-Andean valley).

Family division
Chimuan consisted of three attested languages:

 Mochica (a.k.a. Yunga, Chimú)
 Cañar–Puruhá
 Cañari (a.k.a. Cañar, Kanyari)
 Puruhá (a.k.a. Puruwá, Puruguay)

All languages are now extinct.

Campbell (2012) classifies Mochica and Cañar–Puruhá each as separate language families.

Mochica was one of the major languages of pre-Columbian South America. It was documented by Fernando de la Carrera and Middendorff in the seventeenth and nineteenth centuries respectively. It became extinct ca. 1950, although some people remember a few words. Adelaar & Muysken (2004) consider Mochica a language isolate for now.

Cañari and Puruhá are documented with only a few words. These two languages are usually connected with Mochica. However, as their documentation level is so low, it may not be possible to confirm this association. According to Adelaar & Muysken (2004), Jijón y Caamaño's evidence of their relationship is only a single word: Mochica nech "river", Cañari necha; based on similarities with neighboring languages, he finds a Barbacoan connection more likely.

Quingnam, possibly the same language as Lengua (Yunga) Pescadora, is sometimes taken to be a dialect of Mochica, but it is unattested, unless a list of numerals discovered in 2010 turns out to be Quingnam or Pescadora as expected. Those numerals are not, however, Mochica.

Mason (1950)
Yunca-Puruhán (Chimuan) internal classification by Mason (1950):

Yunca–Puruhán
Yuncan
North group (Puruhá-Cañari)
Puruhá
Canyari (Cañari)
Manabila (Mantenya)
South group (Yunca)
Yunga
Morropé
Eten (?)
Chimu
Mochica (Chincha)
Chanco
Atalán
Wancavilca (Huancavilca)
Mania
Tumbez
Puna
Carake: Apichiki, Cancebi

Mason (1950) also included Atalán, which is no longer considered to be part of the Yunca-Puruhán (Chimuan) family.

Tovar (1961)
Tovar (1961), partly based on Schmidt (1926), adds Tallán (Sechura–Catacao) to Chimuan (which he calls Yunga-Puruhá). Tovar's (1961) classification below is cited from Stark (1972).

Yunga–Puruhá
Northern (Puruha-Cañari)
Puruhá
Cañari
Central (Tallán)
Sec
Sechura
Colán
Catacaos
Southern
Yunga

Proposed external relationships

Stark (1972) proposed a Maya–Yunga–Chipayan macrofamily linking Mayan with Uru–Chipaya and Yunga (Mochica).

Vocabulary
Loukotka (1968) lists the following basic vocabulary items for the Chimuan languages.

{| class="wikitable sortable"
! gloss !! Chimú !! Eten !! Cañari !! Puruhá
|-
! one
| onkó || unik ||  || 
|-
! two
| atput || atput ||  || pax
|-
! head
| lek || xäts || gíchan || 
|-
! hand
| möch || metsan ||  || 
|-
! water
| leng || xa || kay || la
|-
! fire
| hog || óx ||  || 
|-
! sun
| sheang || sheang || chán || 
|-
! maize
| aixa || mang ||  || manga
|-
! bird
| ñaíñ || ñaíñ ||  || ñay
|-
! jaguar
| räk || rak || guagal || guagua
|-
! fish
| shl'ak || t'ak ||  || shl'ak
|-
! house
| ánik || an || án || án
|}

See also
 Mochica language
 Sechura–Catacao languages

References

Further reading
 Adelaar, Willem F. H.; & Muysken, Pieter C. (2004). The languages of the Andes. Cambridge language surveys. Cambridge University Press.
 Campbell, Lyle. (1997). American Indian languages: The historical linguistics of Native America. New York: Oxford University Press. .
 Kaufman, Terrence. (1994). The native languages of South America. In C. Mosley & R. E. Asher (Eds.), Atlas of the world's languages (pp. 46–76). London: Routledge.

External links
 PROEL: Familia Chimúan

 
Proposed language families
Extinct languages of South America